Nectandra olida is a species of plant in the family Lauraceae. It is found in Ecuador and Peru. It is threatened by habitat loss.

References

olida
Trees of Ecuador
Trees of Peru
Vulnerable flora of South America
Taxonomy articles created by Polbot